This is a list of Deputies General of Álava. The Deputy General is the head of the government of Álava, Basque Country, Spain. The post originated in the late fifteenth century, and existed in its first form until the end of Basque home rule in Spain in 1876. From 1877 to 1979, the head of the province of Álava was known as President of the Deputation. The post has existed in its current form since 1979.

List of officeholders

Deputies General (1979-present) 
Governments:

References 

 
Deputy General of Álava